Czech Dream is a 2004 documentary film directed by two Czech film directors, Vít Klusák and Filip Remunda. It recorded a large-scale hoax perpetrated by Klusák and Remunda on the Czech public, culminating in the opening event of a fake hypermarket in the Letňany neighborhood of Prague. The film was their graduation project for film school.

Concept 
Remunda and Klusák invented the Český sen ("Czech dream") hypermarket and created a massive advertising campaign around it. Posing as businessmen, the two film students managed to persuade an ad agency and a public relations agency to create a campaign for them.  Billboards appeared on Czech highways, and 200,000 pamphlets were distributed in Prague.  A jingle was recorded, and there was a series of television commercials. The advertising campaign slogans were "don't come" and "don't spend", etc.

Still, the filmmakers succeeded in attracting more than 3000 shoppers to an empty plain for their "grand opening" on May 31, 2003.  What looked like a huge building from a distance was actually only a canvas facade backed by scaffolding.

As customers gathered, trinkets and small gifts were available—key chains and flags—so that everyone would leave with something. A master of ceremonies kept up a commentary as people gathered and finally asked Klusák and Remunda, the "managers", to cut a ribbon. After this, the barricades were removed, and people could walk or run towards the facade.

When the "customers" finally realized that they had been deceived, they reacted in different ways. Some understood the filmmakers' message, some tried to take it optimistically ("At least we had some fresh air"), but most were angry, and many decided to blame the government. Still, there was no violence against the authors.

The idea for the hoax came from a 2002 study by Incoma Research reporting that 30% of Czechs shop mainly at hypermarkets.  There has been growing concern in the country about the growth of advertising and consumerism.

Prizes

The film won prizes at festivals in Kraków, Jihlava, Ljubljana, Århus, and Pilsen.

On September 8, 2006, it was broadcast by ARTE, and on September 26, 2006, by Australia's Special Broadcasting Service TV. On January 30, 2007, it was broadcast by the VPRO, and on October 9, 2007, by More 4. It was also broadcast by TVR Cultural on January 20, 2009, and Link TV in the USA on June 2, 2011.

See also
 Entropa: another Czech political, artsy hoax
 Subvertising

References

External links 
 Czech Dream: official site of the film in English
 Czech Dream: official site of the film in Czech 
 Economist.com article
 Český Rozhlas article
 Prague Post article
 CzechFolks.com article in Czech and English
 
 

2004 films
2000s Czech-language films
Culture jamming
Czech documentary films
Documentary films about business
Documentary films about consumerism
Hoaxes in the Czech Republic
Performance hoaxes
2004 documentary films
2004 hoaxes
2003 in the Czech Republic
2004 in the Czech Republic